Alvin Leroy Scott (born September 14, 1955) is a former American basketball player for the Phoenix Suns (from 1977 to 1985). Born in Cleveland, Tennessee, he attended Oral Roberts University.

External links

1955 births
Living people
African-American basketball players
American expatriate basketball people in Spain
Basketball players from Tennessee
Liga ACB players
Oral Roberts Golden Eagles men's basketball players
People from Cleveland, Tennessee
Phoenix Suns draft picks
Phoenix Suns players
RCD Espanyol Bàsquet players
Shooting guards
Small forwards
American men's basketball players
21st-century African-American people
20th-century African-American sportspeople